Judith Grimes is a fictional character from the comic book series The Walking Dead and the television series of the same name, where she is portrayed by Cailey Fleming and previously by several child actresses when the character was a newborn.

Appearances

Comic series 
Judith is the daughter of Lori Grimes and possibly Rick Grimes, and the younger sister of Carl Grimes. Judith's biological father could be either Rick or Shane, but Rick told Lori that he did not care if she was Shane's daughter because he will still love her as his daughter. During The Governor's last assault on the prison, Lori is killed by Lilly while holding Judith. Lori falls, crushing Judith, leaving Rick and Carl in total devastation.

Television series

Season 3 

Judith Grimes first appeared in the episode "Killer Within" where she was born via caesarean section carried out by Maggie due to complications that Lori Grimes had during labor. During the caesarean section Lori loses a lot of blood and agonizingly says goodbye to Carl as he shoots her out of mercy to avoid her reanimation. A few days after she was born, Daryl and Maggie goes to get formula milk since baby Judith was weak and could not survive without it, Daryl nicknames her the "Little Asskicker". However, baby Judith was always in the care of Beth and Carol throughout the season.

Season 4 

When an outbreak of a deadly flu came to the prison community, Judith fortunately survived the outbreak. During the last assault of the Governor, she was saved by the sisters Lizzie and Mika Samuels who take the little baby with Tyreese and together they wanted to go to Terminus and on the road Tyreese decides to help a father and his son leaving the little ones to their fate towards a group of walkers who were saved by Carol. When Tyreese and Carol realized Lizzie's mental health breakdown when she saw her younger sister Mika being murdered, Lizzie reveals that she wanted to kill Judith to see her become a walker but Carol manages to stop her. During a debate with Tyreese, they decide to eliminate Lizzie to avoid hurting Judith and the rest of the people. Later, they travelled with the little baby to Terminus.

Season 5 

Judith is still in the care of Tyreese and Carol. When Carol, Tyreese and Judith arrive near Terminus, a walker tries to attack them and is subdued by Carol when the little baby begins to cry and the her crying attracts a herd of walkers. Fortunately, Carol, Tyreese and Judith manage to flee, until they reach a cabin where they discover that their friends were kidnapped and manage to reduce a man named Martin who was from Terminus and stood guard in the cabin. Carol decides to save her friends and Tyreese watched over him. When Martin managed to take Judith as a hostage, Tyreese was forced to leave the cabin where a few walkers tried to reach into the cabin, but Tyreese survived and tackled Martin on the floor and then punches him until leaving him unconscious saving the life of the little girl. After the rescue of Rick and the group Carol appears before Rick and the rest of the group and takes Rick and Carl to Judith who happily reunite again.

Judith was accompanied by her father and the group manage to reach the church of Fr. Gabriel Stokes who gives them asylum in his church where it ends up being a slaughterhouse of the people from Terminus who hunted the group. After the deaths of Beth and Tyreese, Judith arrived into the safe-zone called Alexandria along with the group and was guided by a community recruiter named Aaron.

Season 6 

When the group was working against the massive herd of walkers in a nearby quarry, a group of scavengers called "The Wolves" invade the community by slaughtering several Alexandrians, but Carl protects his sister Judith while the group manages to annihilate the Wolves and consequently the shots and the sound of the horn of a truck attracted the herd that were diverting the group, while the walkers take advantage of the fall of the Alexandrian wall to invade the safe-zone. Fortunately, Judith was carried safely by Fr. Gabriel to his church and the community successfully eliminate the walkers. When Rick and Michonne revealed their romance, Michonne practically became Judith's mother figure.

Season 7 

When Negan meets Judith, he becomes fond of her despite having a rough relationship with her father and promises to protect her and Carl. Later, Judith was transported to the Hilltop. She sits on the ground while Maggie and Jesus talk. Shortly after, Judith stands up and is carried away by Enid.

Season 8 

Judith was always in the care of the Alexandrians during the war against the Saviors, later Carl discovers that he was bitten by a walker, he decides to spend a day with his little sister. Before his death, she manages to survive under the sewers when Negan bombs Alexandria and the little girl is successfully taken to the Hilltop Colony.

Season 9 

Eighteen months after the fall of Negan, Judith lives happily with Rick and Michonne. When the problems began within the communities, Rick was forced to deal with a herd of walkers by destroying a bridge in order to save the communities which apparently the group believes that Rick died. Six years later, a group of survivors led by a woman named Magna are overwhelmed by a herd of walkers and a little girl with a sheriff's hat appears and saves them from the herd and introduces herself as Judith Grimes. It is later revealed that Judith has a very complicated relationship with her adoptive mother Michonne since they have a big disagreement involving about her friendly relationship with Negan, who has a great respect towards her. Judith also has an adoptive brother named Rick Grimes Jr., better known as "R.J.", who is the son of Rick and Michonne conceived before his presumed death. Several months after the massacre during the community's fair done by Alpha, she was saved by Negan when she attempted to save Daryl's dog in the large blizzard during the winter.

Season 10 

In "Lines We Cross", some months after the blizzard, Judith and the Coalition form a militia in order to train the several residents of the communities to face any future treats. She takes part in a training exercise on the Oceanside beach. As Ezekiel and Jerry methodically release walkers from a shipwrecked boat, Judith and the other militia work together as a unit to take out the walker threat. Later on, Judith and R.J. play with some shells that R.J. found. As they dump out their seashells in the sand, a Whisperer mask falls out. Judith gets scared and informs the rest of the group. A while later, Judith tells R.J. the story about Rick blowing the bridge to save his friends. "He died and went to heaven," Judith tells R.J. about "the brave man" in her story. Michonne walks up to hug them, telling them she'd do anything to protect them. Suddenly, an explosion rings out and everyone looks up to witness streaks of fire cascading from the sky. Judith then stays at the camp looking after her brother as the adults deal with the situation.

In "Ghosts", while the Alexandria residents face against waves of walkers pouring onto the community gates over the next 49 hours, Judith stays at her home looking after her brother. When Michonne checks on them in the morning, Judith reminds her mother it's not safe to go to sleep. The next day, Judith keeps looking after her brother when Michonne arrives to sleep with them. As they lay together in bed, Michonne explains to Judith that it is safe to sleep for now.

In "Silence the Whisperers", Judith and her family dine together and share a laugh as they are joined by Daryl. The following morning, Judith accompanies Michonne to visit the Hilltop to help out the community after a tree has fallen down. On the way, Michonne tells Judith never to take enemies by their word. Judith suggests the Whisperers are probably trying to tire them out like R.J. does before he goes to sleep. Suddenly, Michonne spots Ezekiel riding on his own and tells Judith and the group to continue while she investigates. Later that day, the group catches up and they continue their travel to Hilltop. That night, Judith and the convoy arrive to help the Hilltop residents fight off the invading walkers. While fighting, Judith takes out walkers by herself to the proud smile of her mom. The following morning, Judith listens to the council meeting where Michonne announces she will be delivering supplies to Oceanside after receiving reports of potential Whisperer activity. She becomes surprised when Michonne says she will accompany her. Later that day, Judith and a group prepare their convoy and head out on their journey towards Oceanside.

In "The World Before", Judith and the group continue their journey towards Oceanside when they stop briefly after Scott comes across recent footprints on their path. When Luke says he is going as a representative of Hilltop, she jokes that he really wants to see Jules and then asks him what he was whistling before. He explains he was whistling one of his favorite songs and writes it down for her in a book where she is documenting everything that happens to them for the future. When Luke suggests stopping at a nearby library along the way to look for more books, Judith convinces her mother to accept after complaining that she has already read almost every book back in Alexandria. When the group heads inside the library, Judith finds a Russian-English dictionary she gives to Luke for Eugene to understand the satellite parts. As Michonne tells her daughter they can read a book together, she is called over the radio by Magna. Upon hearing Luke screaming for help, she and the group find him in the music section where he explains he was saved by a man before he fled. Judith then remains in silence as her mother informs him of Siddiq's death. Later that day, the group arrives at Oceanside where Judith witnesses as the residents bring the man that saved Luke to the camp and accuse him of being a Whisperer. While the stranger begs he simply wants to get back to his family, Judith watches as the group debates what to do with him. When walkers suddenly invade, she helps take out the threat and slashes the man in the leg to stop him from escaping. Judith then calls out to her mother who proudly congratulates her. That night, Judith reads a book from the man's backpack when he suddenly wakes up. He claims the book is for his daughter and attempts to stop her from reading it but falls due to being tied up. Judith tells him to be careful with his stitches and then leaves when her mother arrives to question him. A while later, Michonne tells Judith her plan of helping the man get back to his family on a naval base in exchange for weapons to destroy Alpha's horde but says she needs to go alone. Judith understands her mother's decision and they hug. The next day, Judith listens as Michonne informs the group of her mission and gives them a radio to contact her if they need to. She also tells Judith she can contact her at any time and reminds her to be good with her uncle Daryl until she returns. Judith then bids her mother farewell before she and the rest of the group travel back to their communities.

Development and reception 

Cailey Fleming enter the final part of the fifth episode "What Comes After" in the ninth season as part of the recurring cast and despite that she appeared in the section "also starring". In the following tenth season, Fleming was promoted to the main cast of the series giving importance to being a member of the surviving Grimes family.

According to showrunner Angela Kang, to adapt the comic's story, they plan on taking some of the role that Carl had and giving them to Judith, now aged similarly to Carl, which allows them to follow the main threads of the comic's Whisperer arc but with a new take using Judith's personality.

Matt Fowler of IGN expressed in this way about the development of Cailey Fleming portraying Judith Grimes after a brief appearance in season 9:

Louisa Mellor writing for Den of Geek! praised Cailey Fleming and said: "Judith Grimes is hardly the only, or the first powerful little girl on TV with things to teach us. She's part of a growing gang (Lisa Simpson's the founding member, obviously, Stranger Things''' Eleven is the muscle). These girls and their real-world counterparts are here with lessons to teach us, and mostly, we're all ears."

Josh Wigler of The Hollywood Reporter said: "As played by Star Wars: The Force Awakens actress Cailey Fleming, Judith's arrival as an apocalypse-tested warrior marks a major deviation from how events unfold in Robert Kirkman and Charlie Adlard's Walking Dead comic books on which the AMC show is based. In their original telling of the tale, Judith died as an infant, alongside her mother Lori when the Governor unleashed the full power of Woodbury on the prison. In the TV series, Lori died much earlier than expected, while Judith's fate was left lingering following the Governor's assault on the prison. It was revealed some episodes later that baby Judith wound up in the care of Carol and Tyreese, featured heavily in season four's episode "The Grove", a consensus pick for one of the very best episodes in Walking Dead history."

Kirsten Acuna writing for Insider write and praise Angela Kang's work as showrunner. Kang stated about Fleming: "She's such a professional actress at 11 years old. Her first two days on set, the actors, Danai [Gurira], Jeffrey [Dean Morgan], they're all like, 'Oh my God, she's out-acting all of us.' They really love the work that she's doing and love working with her. She's just absolutely fantastic for us."

Christopher Weston writing for HITC praised the ninth season including the character of Cailey Fleming as Judith Grimes and said: "The show was an immense success, becoming one of the most widely discussed and watched efforts on TV at the time. However, enthusiasts will know that series' can feel a little stale as they overstay their welcome. Gradually, many fans began to fall out of love with The Walking Dead, feeling that it was dragging on unnecessarily. Over the years they've thrown in new faces and curveballs to keep things interesting, and with season 10 now in full swing, we're welcoming Cailey Fleming firmly to the fold."

Erik Kain of Forbes commented on her appearance in "Who Are You Now?", saying: "Judith is a great little kid. She's tough, sweet, compassionate, and just an all around badass that the people of Alexandria respect and even defer to in some instances. A budding relationship is forming between her and Negan, who remains in prison though with a good deal less hair. Whatever relationship was supposed to form between Carl and Negan is happening instead between these two, with Judith on the steps doing math and Negan telling her what's the point."

The writer Alex Zalben of Decider praised Fleming's development in the series and said: "Cailey Fleming playing Judith Grimes is easily her biggest role so far. Walking Dead has been a mixed bag when it comes to child actors (there have been some... not so great ones), but with Fleming's strong back catalog of roles, tall Judith looks like it'll fall on the better side of the equation."

Kevin Lever of Tell-Tale TV'' praised the performance of Fleming as Judith and wrote: "There's a lot of great work being done with Judith that's fleshing her out as the kindest heart left in this world."

References

External links 
 Cailey Fleming as Judith Grimes on IMDb

Characters created by Robert Kirkman
Child characters in comics
Child characters in television
Comics characters introduced in 2007
Fictional characters from Georgia (U.S. state)
Fictional characters from Kentucky
Fictional child soldiers
Fictional murderers
The Walking Dead (franchise) characters